Victor Hubinon (26 April 1924 – 8 January 1979) was a Belgian comic-book artist, best known for the series Buck Danny and Redbeard.

Biography 
Victor Hubinon was born in Angleur, Belgium, in 1924. He studied at the Arts Academy of Liège and fled to England later during World War II, where he served in the Royal Navy. After the war ended, he returned to Belgium and when he was 22, he started working as an illustrator for the newspaper La Meuse. He got a contract with businessman and journalist Georges Troisfontaines, who started the press agency "World Press". There, Hubinon met Jean-Michel Charlier, another illustrator for the agency. They first collaborated on a short comic story, but Troisfontaines created for them a new hero, Buck Danny, about a trio of fictional American pilots in World War II. Troisfontaines dropped out after he had written the first fifteen pages, whereupon Charlier and Hubinon continued it on their own. Quite soon, Charlier quit drawing and specialized in writing the stories, while Hubinon did all the artwork. The strip appeared in Spirou magazine, the comics weekly of publisher Dupuis, and became over the next thirty years one of the most popular and enduring series of the magazine. After 50 years, more than 20 million albums had been sold. Unusual about the series was that it kept very securely up-to-date, with the heroes always flying in the most recent planes and participating in current events.

Hubinon experimented with humoristic, caricatural stories in his early years as a comics artist. He even made one story about Blondin et Cirage, two heroes created by Jijé, but thereafter, the series returned to Jijé, and Hubinon mostly stuck to his realistic work, such as Buck Danny, the biographies of Surcouf, Stanley and Jean Mermoz, and a fictionalized retelling of the Battle of Tarawa.

When Charlier, together with a few friends like René Goscinny, created the new Pilote magazine in 1959, he wrote for Hubinon the realistic pirate series Redbeard, which would continue for some twenty years. The pirate crew in this series was the inspiration for their comical counterpart in the other main series of Pilote, Asterix.

In 1977, Hubinon created a new series, La Mouette, with stories by Gigi Maréchal. He died in 1979 from a heart attack, before the second part of the series was finished.

Bibliography

Awards and honors 
 1971: Best realistic artwork at the Prix Saint-Michel, Brussels, Belgium
 Asteroid 301511 Hubinon, discovered by French amateur astronomer Bernard Christophe in 2009, was named in his memory. The official  was published by the Minor Planet Center on 12 March 2017.

References 
 

 Béra, Michel; Denni, Michel; and Mellot, Philippe (2002): "Trésors de la Bande Dessinée 2003-2004". Paris, Les éditions de l'amateur. 
 Hubinon publications in Spirou and Pilote BDoubliées

External links 
 Victor Hubinon biography on Lambiek Comiclopedia
 Victor Hubinon biography on Dupuis

1924 births
1979 deaths
Artists from Liège
Belgian comics writers
Belgian comics artists
Buck Danny